Open Mind is an album by French jazz fusion artist Jean-Luc Ponty, released in 1984.

Track listing 
All songs by Jean-Luc Ponty.
"Open Mind" – 8:05
"Solitude" – 6:05
"Watching Birds" – 4:57
"Modern Times Blues" – 7:17
"Orbital Encounters" – 5:14
"Intuition" – 7:40

Personnel 
 Jean-Luc Ponty – violin, violectra, piano, organ, synthesizer, keyboards, vocals, rhythm programming
 George Benson – electric guitar (track 4)
 Chick Corea – synthesizer (tracks 1, 3)
 Casey Scheuerell – drums, tabla (track 3)
 Rayford Griffin – drums, percussion (track 5)

Production notes
Jean-Luc Ponty – producer
Dan Nash – engineer
Peter R. Kelsey – engineer, mixing
Steve Hirsch – engineer, assistant engineer
Dave Marquette – engineer, assistant engineer
John Molino – engineer, assistant engineer
Jay Willis – engineer, assistant engineer
Dan Warme – engineer, assistant engineer
Gary Wagner – engineer, assistant engineer
Claudia Ponty – cover art concept

Charts

References

External links 
 Jean-Luc Ponty - Open Mind (1984) album review by Richard S. Ginell, credits & releases at AllMusic
 Jean-Luc Ponty - Open Mind (1984) album releases & credits at Discogs

1984 albums
Jean-Luc Ponty albums
Atlantic Records albums